Bartholomew Good (20 January 1812 – 12 March 1848), known as Billy Good, was an English professional cricketer who played first-class cricket from 1831 to 1847.

A left-handed batsman and left arm slow orthodox roundarm bowler who was mainly associated with Nottingham Cricket Club, Nottinghamshire and Marylebone Cricket Club (MCC), he made 68 known appearances in first-class matches.  He represented the Players in the Gentlemen v Players series and the North in the North v. South series.

References

1812 births
1848 deaths
English cricketers
English cricketers of 1826 to 1863
Players cricketers
Nottinghamshire cricketers
North v South cricketers
Hampshire cricketers
Marylebone Cricket Club cricketers
Midland Counties cricketers
Left-Handed v Right-Handed cricketers
Married v Single cricketers
Nottingham Cricket Club cricketers
Fast v Slow cricketers